Peter Taylor may refer to:

Arts
 Peter Taylor (writer) (1917–1994), American author, winner of the Pulitzer Prize for Fiction
 Peter Taylor (film editor) (1922–1997), English film editor, winner of an Academy Award for Film Editing

Politics and government 
 Peter Taylor (paymaster) (1714–1777), British politician, MP for Wells and MP for Portsmouth
 Peter Alfred Taylor (1819–1891), British politician and radical
 Peter Taylor, Baron Taylor of Gosforth (1930–1997), Lord Chief Justice of England and Wales, 1992–1997
 Peter Taylor alias Perce, Member of Parliament (MP) for Marlborough in 1554
 Peter Taylor (British politician), Mayor of Watford

Sport
 Pete Taylor (1945–2003), American sports broadcaster
 Pete Taylor (baseball) (1927–2003), American baseball pitcher
 Peter Taylor (Australian footballer) (born 1954), Australian rules footballer
 Peter Taylor (Australian cricketer) (born 1956), Australian cricketer
 Peter Taylor (English cricketer) (born 1942), former cricketer for Bedfordshire
 Peter Taylor (South African cricketer) (born 1934), South African cricketer
 Peter Taylor (footballer, born 1928) (1928–1990), English football goalkeeper and manager, associated with Brian Clough
 Peter Taylor (footballer, born 1953) (born 1953), English football manager and former player
 Peter Taylor (rower) (born 1984), New Zealand Olympic rower
 Pete Taylor (boxing coach), former boxer turned boxing coach

Other fields 
 Peter Taylor (botanist) (1926–2011), British botanist at Royal Botanic Gardens, Kew
 Peter Taylor (journalist) (born 1942), British journalist and author of non-fiction books, especially about Northern Ireland and Al-Qaeda
 Peter J. Taylor (born 1944), British geographer
 Peter Taylor (environmentalist) (born 1948), British environmentalist
 Peter Taylor (priest) (born 1944), Archdeacon of Harlow

Characters 
 Peter Taylor (General Hospital), a character from the soap opera General Hospital